Northeast Slopes is a ski area located in Corinth, Vermont, United States. Northeast Slopes is operated entirely by volunteers.  It has approximately 340 vertical feet of skiing across 35 acres of terrain served by two rope tows and a T-Bar.

History 
Northeast Slopes began in 1936 from an agreement between Bradford, VT Winter Sports Club president George Eaton, and land owner Eugene Eastman.

References 

Ski areas and resorts in Vermont
Corinth, Vermont